The Gila Bend Unified School District is a small school district in the town of Gila Bend, Arizona. It operates a combined elementary/junior high school and Gila Bend High School.

References

External links
 

School districts in Maricopa County, Arizona